The Somaschi Fathers, also known as the Somascans and officially as the Order of Clerics Regular of Somasca, are a Catholic order of Clerics Regular of Pontifical Right for men. It was founded in Italy in the 16th century by Jerome Emiliani and named after the motherhouse at Somasca.

, there were currently 520 Somascans serving around the world. They provide staff for boys' homes, serve in 95 parishes, and engage in other ministries.

History

In 1532, the priests Alessandro Besuzio and Agostino Bariso joined the charitable labors of Jerome Emiliani, a converted former soldier from Venice. Emiliani founded the religious order called the "Company of the Servants of the Poor" in 1534, calling together his collaborators and companions for a general assembly. This handful of laymen and priests adopted an organized structure for the movement of religious and social reform started by Jerome in 1529 in Venice. Their goal was to dedicate themselves to the care, assistance, promotion of poor, orphans, abandoned youth, sick, etc., to any kind of works of mercy, and to any pastoral ministry according to the instructions of the bishops. Jerome placed the motherhouse at Somascha, a secluded hamlet between Milan and Bergamo. The group was recognized by the papal nuncio to the Republic of Venice in 1535. Jerome Emiliani died at dawn on 8 February 1537, (and was canonized in 1767).

After the death of Jerome the community was about to disband, but was kept together by Angelo Marco Gambarana, who had been chosen superior. It was approved by Pope Paul III in 1540, and confirmed by Pius IV in 1563. In 1568 the community was constituted a religious order, according to the Rule of St. Augustine, with solemn vows, by Pius V with the name of Somascan Regular Clerics. At this time the first Constitutions were issued to define a common lifestyle for all its members, both lay and clergy.

In 1547 the Somascans were briefly united with the Theatines, but as the care of orphans was different from the purpose of the latter community, they separated in 1554. In 1569 the first six members made their profession, and Gambarana was made first superior general. Great favour was shown to the order by St. Charles Borromeo, and he gave it the church of St. Mayeul at Pavia, from which church the order takes its official name "Clerici regulares S. Majoli Papiae congregationis Somaschae".

Later the education of youth was put into the programme of the order, and the colleges at Rome and Pavia became renowned. It spread into Austria and Switzerland, and before the great Revolution it had 119 houses in its four provinces: Rome, Lombardy, Venice, and France.

Spirituality
The spirituality of St. Jerome consists in the desire to bring the Church "to the state of holiness" of the early Christian communities, serving Christ especially in poor, abandoned children and, showing them the tender "fatherhood and motherhood" of God. In the rule, Jerome puts down as the principal work of the community the care of orphans, poor, and sick, and demands that dwellings, food and clothing shall bear the mark of religious poverty.

The Order extended its charitable ministries beyond the care of orphans by supporting and staffing seminaries (just then mandated by the Council of Trent), by educating and forming youth, and by ministering to people in parishes. Its expansion, however, was abruptly stopped by laws obstructing religious life issued by Napoleon in 1810 and by the Italian government in 1861. It followed a painful dark period characterized by persecution, injustice, suffering, from which only at the beginning of the 20th century did the Order emerge with new vitality. Its expansion resumed, reaching new continents and new countries. Nowadays, the Somascans number about 500 religious.

Today
The Somascan Fathers and Brothers continue St. Jerome's mission as either priests or brothers by living in communities, pursuing holiness by prayer and ministry to the poor, living in humility and kindness, loving poverty and work, praying to Jesus and Mary. They perform different ministries in the Church, such as the care of orphans, the disadvantaged and the poor; the treatment of at-risk youth; the rehabilitation of drug addicts; education; pastoral care and spiritual guidance; the pastoral care of minorities; foreign missions; and youth formation. They work in group homes, treatment and rehabilitation centers, retreat houses, schools, youth centers, and parishes.

The Somascan operate in the following continents/countries: 
 Europe: Italy, Spain, Poland, Romania, Albania; 
 Americas: USA, Mexico, Guatemala, Honduras, El Salvador, Colombia, Ecuador, Brazil, Santo Domingo; 
 Asia: the Philippines, India, Sri Lanka, Indonesia, Australia; 
 Africa: Mozambique and Nigeria.

References

External links

Clerics regular
1532 establishments in Italy
Religious organizations established in the 1530s
Catholic religious orders established in the 16th century